Armen Ohanian, born Sophia Pirboudaghian (1887–1976) was an Armenian dancer, actress, writer, and translator.

Biography
Armen Ohanian was born in Shamakha, then part of the Russian Empire (now in Azerbaijan) to an upper-class Armenian family. A devastating earthquake in 1902 caused her family to move to Baku, where she attended a Russian school. She graduated in 1905, the same year the anti-Armenian pogroms, which she witnessed, caused the death of her father, Emanuel. She was hurriedly married to an Armenian Iranian doctor, Haik Ter-Ohanian, but the marriage ended within a year. She began her acting career as Sophia Ter-Ohanian in the theater group of the Armenian Cultural Union of Baku in 1906. She moved to Moscow in 1908 and studied plastic arts at the Nelidova School, while performing her first dances at the Maly Theatre.

After a short stint at the Tbilisi Opera in 1909, where she appeared for the first time as Armen Ohanian, she traveled again to Iran, where she performed as a dancer and actress during the last period of the Iranian Constitutional Revolution. She was among the founders of the Persian National Theater in Tehran. In April 1910 she organized a musical and literary gala in cooperation with the Persian Women Benevolent Association. For the first time, Iranian women were able to play on the stage and watch a film. In May 1910 she produced and directed Nikolai Gogol's The Government Inspector in Persian, playing the role of Maria Antonovna.

While in Iran, she perfected her skills in Oriental dances. After leaving the country and touring Egypt and the Ottoman Empire, she was hired to perform in London in 1911. From then to the late 1920s she would become quite a sought-after name, as part of the craze for exotic dances that swept the Western cultural scene at the time. By using methods of "free dance" developed by the famous American dancer Isadora Duncan, she created her own choreography based on Armenian and Iranian music. Many of her dances, such as "Salome," "At the Temple of Anahit," "Treason," "The Matchmaker," "Haschich," "The Great Khan of Shamakha," "Towards Nirvana," and others, fascinated the European public. She performed "wonderful Persian Dances" in a production of Lakme at the London Opera House in 1915. She performed extensively in London, Paris, Brussels, Milan, Sofia, Madrid, and other European cities, as well as in the United States and Mexico. Her performances were widely covered in the press and met the approval of writers such as Maurice Maeterlinck, René Ghil, Claude Anet, and others.

After settling in Paris in 1912, Ohanian made her first forays into literature, and her poems and autobiographical sketches eventually found their way in the press. Her first book, The Dancer of Shamakha, was published in 1918 in French, prefaced by Anatole France. The book was translated into English, Spanish, German, Swedish, and Finnish. She later published other memoirs in French, such as In the Claws of Civilization in 1921, The Laughs of A Snake Charmer in 1931; an account of her 1927 sojourn in the Soviet Union, In the Sixth Part of the World: Journey into Russia in 1928; and a novel, The Soloist of His Majesty, in 1929.

Her love life in the twilight of the Belle Époque was no less eventful than her artistic career. She had relationships with various people such as painter Émile Bernard, writers Maurice Barres and Andre Germain, and a short-lived affair with American writer Natalie Barney. She married for the second time to Mexican economist and diplomat Makedonio Garza in 1922, and after living in Hamburg, Mexico, New York, Paris, Moscow, London, and Madrid, the couple settled in Mexico in 1934.

The decline of her dance career did not deter Ohanian from pursuing cultural and political interests. Having become interested in the native dances of Mexico during a brief trip in 1922–1923, she founded a school of dance in Mexico City in 1936. Committed to communism since the mid-1920s, Ohanian was an active member of the Mexican Communist Party. In collaboration with her husband, she translated many books from Russian into Spanish, but also became a prolific author in her own right with books on Russian, Soviet, and Mexican literature. In 1946 she published Happy Armenia, a book on Soviet Armenia in Spanish, which marked a renewal of interest in her Armenian ancestry. Among her literary output, however, her work of choice was a poem, "My Dream as an Exile," written in Armenian and published in 1952 in a journal of Paris.

Ohanian made a comeback in the Mexican dance scene in 1940-1941 and 1946, and appeared on the stage in Paris in 1949 and 1953, when she was well into her sixties. During a second visit to the Soviet Union in 1958 with her husband, they traveled briefly to Yerevan, Armenia, where she offered part of her private files to the Museum of Literature and Arts. After returning to Mexico, she continued to write, translate, and publish until 1969, when she produced her last volume of memoirs in Spanish.

See also
 Shamakhi dancers

References

Bakhchinyan, Artsvi, and Matiossian, Vartan, Շամախեցի պարուհին (The Dancer of Shamakha), Yerevan, 2007.

External links
The Dancer of Shamakha by Armen Ohanian (full view)

1887 births
1976 deaths
Russian female dancers
French female dancers
French writers
Mexican people of Armenian descent
Mexican communists
Mexican female dancers
Mexican women writers
People from Shamakhi
Armenian people from the Russian Empire
Expatriates from the Russian Empire in Iran
Emigrants from the Russian Empire to France
French emigrants to Mexico